Greater Johnstown High School is a public high school in the eastern United States, which is located in between the neighborhoods of Moxham, 8th Ward, and Hornerstown in Johnstown, Pennsylvania. It is the only high school operated by the Greater Johnstown School District. 

During the 2019–2020 school year, enrollment was reported as 1,100 pupils in 8th through 12th grades.

Extracurriculars
Greater Johnstown School District offers a wide variety of clubs, activities and an extensive, publicly funded sports program.

Competitive musical groups 
Greater Johnstown High School's competitive groups compete on the NJA/TOB Circuit. The Marching Band and Indoor Percussion ensembles are directed by Eric Pfeil and Jon Donath, and the Indoor/Outdoor Color Guard is directed by Jackie Willnecker.
Marching Band: Group 2 Open Class
Indoor Percussion: Scholastic Novice A Percussion
Essay Performance Company: Scholastic A Guard

Athletics 
Johnstown participates in high school athletics as a member of the Laurel Highlands Athletics Conference (LHAC). The school is located in Pennsylvania Interscholastic Athletic Association (PIAA) District 6.

Boys' athletics 
 Baseball - Class AAAA
 Basketball - Class AAAAA
 Football - Class AAAA
 Soccer - Class AAA
 Track and field - Class AAA
 Wrestling - Class AAA

Johnstown appeared in the 2005 PIAA Class AAA Boys' Basketball state title game before falling to Steelton-Highspire High School. The Team also won the class AAA district 6 title in Football and Boys' Basketball in 2009.

Girls' athletics 
 Basketball - Class AAAA
 Cheerleading - Class AAAAAA
 Soccer - Class AAA
 Softball - Class AAAA
 Track and field - Class AAA
 Volleyball - Class AAA

Notable alumni and faculty
Carroll Baker, actress
Steve Ditko, Spider-Man comics co-creator
Carlton Haselrig, former Pittsburgh Steelers Pro-Bowler
Tim Kazurinsky, Saturday Night Live actor
Gene Kelly, dancer and actor, choreographer for the Johnstown High School musicals.
Geroy Simon, CFL all-time receptions leader
LaRod Stephens-Howling, former Pittsburgh Steelers running back
Gerald Zahorchak, former Secretary of Education for the Commonwealth of Pennsylvania

References

External links

1895 establishments in Pennsylvania
High schools in Central Pennsylvania
Educational institutions established in 1895
Public high schools in Pennsylvania
Schools in Cambria County, Pennsylvania